Miramonte may refer to:
 Miramonte, California, in Fresno County
 Miramonte High School, in Orinda, California
 Miramonte Elementary School, an elementary school within the Los Angeles Unified School District in which child abuse scandals broke in 2012
 Miramonte Natural Area, a protected area in San Miguel County, Colorado, USA
 Iglesia Bautista Miramonte, in San Salvador, El Salvador

See also 
 Miramontes, a surname